Kismat is a 2004 Indian Hindi-language action film directed by Guddu Dhanoa, starring Bobby Deol and Priyanka Chopra in the lead roles. It also stars Kabir Bedi, Sanjay Narvekar,  Smita Jaykar and Ashish Vidyarthi. This was the last film produced by Time Magnetics.

Plot
Tony works as a hit-man for a gangster, Vikas Patil, who owes his allegiance to wealthy Raj Mallya. Raj Mallya has involved in marketing spurious and out-dated drugs, and as a result is the subject of an investigation by the Food & Drugs Administration's inspector Dr. Hargobind Gosai. Raj asks Vikas to take care of Hargobind through Tony, which Tony does, and in this manner, Raj is absolved of all wrongdoing. Then Tony meets with an attractive starlet named, Sapna, and falls head over heels in love with her. When Sapna tells him that she is engaged to be married to Dr. Ajay Saxena, he is heart-broken. Then a scandal breaks out, and Hargobind is implicated in the deaths of three children that were killed by Raj's spurious drugs. All the evidence points against Hargobind and not a single lawyer is willing to take his case; his wife kills herself, and the marriage of his daughter has been canceled. Then Tony finds out that Hargobind is none other than Sapna's dad – and he has ruined the only chance he had for marrying the girl of his dreams.

Cast
Bobby Deol as Tony
Priyanka Chopra as Sapna Gosai
Kabir Bedi as Raj Mallya
Sanjay Narvekar as Goli (Toni's Friend)
Mohan Joshi as Dr. Hargobind Gosai
Amit Behl as Dr Ajay Saxena, Sapna's fiancé
Shahbaz Khan as Raj Mallya's son
Imran Khan as Vijay Sharma, elder son of Raj Mallya
Smita Jaykar as Mrs. Sangeeta Gosai
Ashish Vidyarthi as Vikas Patil
Mushtaq Khan as Pankaj Bhai (Sapna's secretary)
Veerendra Saxena as Sinha (Mallya's secretary)

Soundtrack
The music was composed by Anand Raj Anand and the lyrics were penned by Dev Kohli. There are nine tracks in the album, including three instrumentals.

Critical reception
Taran Adarsh of IndiaFM gave the film 1.5 stars out of 5, writing ″On the whole, KISMAT is a predictable fare that holds appeal for front-benchers mainly. For the gentry and the multiplex audiences, it has precious little to offer. However, its reasonable price should prove advantageous for its distributors.″ Sukanya Verma of Rediff.com gave a negative review writing ″All of Dhanoa's action flicks—like Ziddi and Salaakhen—are consistent: they all reek of clichés. They defy logic too. There is nothing wrong in being illogical as long as it is unapologetic. Dhanoa's Ziddi clicked despite being unbelievably implausible because Sunny Deol could carry it off. But in Kismat, Bobby Deol is unable to do a bade bhaiya (big brother). Anupama Chopra of India Today wrote ″Needless to say, nobody rises above the film. Deol and Chopra look dazed and confused. The villains are fit for Cartoon Network and the endless item numbers, pure tedium. Unlike Rudraksh,Kismet isn't even unintentional comedy. Skip it.″ Manish Gajjar of BBC.com wrote ″On the whole, Kismat has very little to offer in terms of content. Its pure entertainment Bollywood style. What Kismat (meaning fate!) awaits this film at the UK box office? Your guess is good as mine.″

References

External links
 

2004 films
2000s Hindi-language films
Indian action films
Indian gangster films
Films scored by Anand Raj Anand
2004 action films
Films directed by Guddu Dhanoa